Lochloosa Creek is a stream that flows from north to south through eastern Alachua County, Florida. Its watershed composed of  through natural and Silvicultural land use. It is the largest tributary to Lochloosa Lake. Lochloosa Creek is longest creek in Alachua County.

Headwaters
Forming from the Saluda Swamp, Lochloosa Creek begins as a small trickle of a stream that flows south. It flows through agricultural lands.

References

Rivers of Alachua County, Florida
Rivers of Florida